Roughnecks: Starship Troopers Chronicles is a CGI animated television series based on the 1959 novel Starship Troopers by Robert A. Heinlein and the 1997 movie adaptation.  The film's director, Paul Verhoeven, served as executive producer. It follows the exploits of the Mobile Infantry squad, "Razak's Roughnecks," during the SICON–Bugs War between a newly united humanity and an extraterrestrial race, known as the "Bugs," also sometimes referred to as Arachnids. The show focuses mainly on the Roughnecks' missions, rather than addressing the larger war.

The series aired for one season in the syndicated Bohbot Kids Network block beginning in August 1999 in the United States and Canada. It was later picked up by the Sci-Fi Channel in the U.S. (along with the rest of the BKN block) and Teletoon in Canada. The entire series is available to be streamed on Crackle in the U.S., along with several Minisodes.

The show combines elements of Verhoeven's film and the original novel, such as the extraterrestrial race known as the Skinnies, powered armor suits and drop pods. The series also adds some original elements (e.g., the war starts on Pluto), while omitting the political aspects of the original work and film.

Plot
When the Mobile Infantry defeats an infestation on Pluto, the world is united as the Strategically Integrated Coalition of Nations (SICON) declares war on the insectoids.

The main story focuses on a group of troopers known as Alpha Teamotherwise known as Razak's Roughneckswho are headed back to Pluto after Operation Pest Control.

After destroying Bug City on Pluto, SICON sights a giant Transport Bug. This reveals that the Bugs are not native to Pluto. They track it to the planet Hydora, which orbits a star in the Constellation Virgo and encounter a Brain Bug, an intelligent Bug that controls the other castes so they won't go insane and destroy each other. The Bugs are planning to take control of the entire universe and won't stop until the human race is extinct.

SICON attempts to set up a base on the planet Tophet, inhabited by a species nicknamed Skinnies. The Skinnies, however, have been enslaved by the Bugs to mine Xylon, a precious mineral used for Transport Bugs. The Mobile Infantry are able to destroy the Control Bugs overseeing the Skinnies and free Tophet, but the victory costs them their comrade Carl Jenkins, who has been put into a state of mental trauma. The Skinnies soon enlist in SICON to fight the Bugs, mainly due to their lack of interstellar travel technology.

SICON soon discovers the existence of the Bug homeworld Klendathu. They attempt to destroy the Bug Queen but she escapes, headed for Earth. Her Transport Bug is destroyed before she reaches the human homeworld, but she nevertheless makes it to Earth. With numerous battles on the home front and the arrival of Bug reinforcements, the battle had only just begun.

Campaigns
The series is divided into eight story arcs or "campaigns," with five episodes each. Each campaign takes place at a different location. In the DVD release, each campaign is on a single disk.
The Pluto Campaign (5 episodes) Takes place on Pluto.
The Hydora Campaign (5 episodes) Takes place on Hydora, which is almost entirely covered by water.
The Tophet Campaign (5 episodes) Takes place on Tophet, a desert planet which is home to the Skinnies.
The Tesca Campaign (5 episodes) Takes place on the jungle moon of Tesca Nemerosa.
The Zephyr Campaign (5 episodes) Takes place on a frozen asteroid.
The Klendathu Campaign (5 episodes) Takes place on the Bugs' home world Klendathu.
Trackers (5 episodes) 1st takes place on the journey from Klendathu to Earth. The others are recaps. 4th has Rico floating through space. 5th investigates Razak.
The Homefront Campaign (5 episodes; 4 others planned but never completed) Takes place on Earth.

Production
The show was produced by Columbia TriStar Television and Sony Pictures for daily television syndication and ended its run of a single season with a cliffhanger instead of a proper series finale.

Though originally planned for 2-D animation, Sony contracted Foundation Imaging to produce the episodes with 3-D computer animation. Since Foundation was unable to keep up with the production schedule, Flat Earth Productions were involved with creating episodes 12 and 13, Hyper Image with 20 to 22, and Rainbow Studios with 23 to 25.

The series was to end with a titanic battle (on a larger scale than any previous episode) against the Bug forces on Earth, but production halted before this story arc was fully developed. Of the 40 episodes originally scheduled, only 36 were completed due to the production problems.  Each week was to be a separate campaign with five daily episodes.

In the Homefront Campaign only five episodes were completed, with the last three episodes ("Gates of Hell," "Circle of the Damned" and "Final Inferno") left incomplete, along with "Homefront," a key episode in the campaign. "Homefront" was to show the destruction of Buenos Aires, referenced in later episodes. Summaries of two of these episodes are available at the TrooperPX website.

The missing episodes had their dialogue recorded, according to the Station Eight website, and some of their animation completed. This existing material was not included in the series' DVD release. Some of that material leaked online. A version of the lost episodes was performed once in 2000 in Orlando as an audio play at the annual Gathering of the Gargoyles fan convention, according to the story editor of the final arc.

In order to fulfill Sony's 40-episode order, four clip shows were produced, reusing footage from previous episodes along with snippets of new material. "Pluto and Beyond" and "Propaganda Machine" can be thought of as coming near the beginning of the Tophet Campaign. These summarize the events of that the preceding Pluto Campaign and a few Tophet events, without adding new material. In "Marooned," one of the main characters becomes lost alone in space and has flashbacks about events from the Pluto through Zephyr Campaigns (in no particular order); it appears intended to take place in the midst of the Klendathu Campaign.  "Court-Martial of Lt. Razak" also takes place during the Klendathu Campaign (specifically, day 165), with various characters giving testimony (shown as previous-episode flashbacks from the entire series); of the four clip shows, it is the only one to introduce significant plot points.  All four have been released on DVD.

Problems

Fan sites bemoaned production and distribution problems that prevented the series from finding an audience before it was canceled. Among the issues cited by Glen Oliver of Ain't It Cool News are:

The series was sold to syndication to air five episodes per week before there were enough episodes to accommodate this schedule. This resulted in a few episodes being repeatedly rerun, alienating viewers.
Individual stations syndicating the show aired new episodes as they were completed, interrupting presently airing story arcs.
The series was sold to SyFy without proper authorization. This soured relations between Sony and SyFy to the point that the cable channel lost the rights to air the show.
One of the two effects companies working on the show was fired after a few episodes, ruining an already overly ambitious production schedule.
"Flashback" or "clip show" episodes were added to fill gaps created by the inability to meet the production schedule.
Some stations aired the series between 5 and 6 AM, while the Sci-Fi Channel aired the series at 7:30 AM, both of which Oliver feels were hardly desirable time slots for the target audience.

Fan campaign and DVD releases
With a fan campaign begun by the now defunct Roughneck Chronicles website, the Pluto Campaign was released on DVD. Based on sales, the other arcs were released on DVD. However, these subsequent DVDs were released in order of popularity, not in chronological order. The last DVD released was called "Trackers," containing an episode bridging the gaps between the Klendathu Campaign and Homefront Campaign DVDs, and the four clip show episodes. Unlike the other DVDs, "Trackers" did not have any cast or crew commentaries.

The DVDs were re-released as a 4-disc Roughnecks: Starship Troopers Chronicles – The Complete Campaigns box set, which consists of stripped down versions of the individual DVD releases, removing the cast and crew commentaries (and in the United Kingdom edition the Tesca Campaign is incorrectly listed as volume 2, instead of volume 4).

Given the success of the earlier DVDs, it was hoped that the sales would encourage Sony to produce a final direct-to-DVD movie to complete the original Homefront Campaign story arc, but there have been no new announcements regarding the Roughneck series. The original production company, Foundation Imaging, has since dissolved. 

While the series ends on a cliffhanger, the story editor of the final arc outlined his plan for the final three episodes on the crew commentary of the Homefront Campaign DVD (not included on the box set version).

Mill Creek Entertainment announced the complete series on DVD.

Characters

Earth forces

Alpha Team a.k.a. Razak's Roughnecks (later Rico's Roughnecks)
 Private/Corporal/Sergeant/Lieutenant John T. "Johnny" Rico (voiced by Rino Romano) – The main focus of the series, Rico is a good soldier but a little distrustful of technology ("I couldn't stand being in one of those tin cans") and a bit over-reliant on his instincts. He is best friends with Carl Jenkins and Dizzy Flores, and carries a torch for Carmen Ibanez for most of the series but eventually admits he is in love with Dizzy and they eventually become a couple. Rico is the last of the Roughnecks to accept T'Phai. He is promoted first to Corporal during the Zephyr Campaign, then to Sergeant in the Klendathu Campaign as a result of Brutto's paralysis, and finally to Lieutenant during the Homefront Campaign, carrying on Razak's legacy.
 Private Isabelle "Dizzy" Flores (voiced by Elizabeth Daily) – An old friend of Rico's from high school, Dizzy has a crush on him which is unrequited for most of the series.  She figures they will sort out their relationship problems after their tour of duty. She had a relationship with Goss in an attempt to make Rico jealous which ended in the Tesca Campaign, but started an affair with Zander Barcalow for the rest of the Tesca Campaign and the entire Zephyr Campaign.  This shattered as Barcalow became a Bug/Human hybrid during the Klendathu Campaign. She eventually redeems Barcalow in the Klendathu Campaign. In the Homefront campaign, Rico eventually admits to being in love with her, but Dizzy rejects him, revealing that she believes herself to be a "jinx" and that any relationship would bring about Rico's death. And, to keep him at a distance, she suggest that SICON command would find their behavior "wholly inappropriate" because of their respective ranks, hinting at the threat of fraternization issues that would arise if she made them aware of the situation. However, despite this, Dizzy still harbors feelings for Rico and eventually they do become a couple. Dizzy is claustrophobic, but lied about it to be accepted into the Mobile Infantry; her phobia was later remedied by Jenkins, who used his psychic powers to give her something akin to a very strong post-hypnotic suggestion.
 Lieutenant Jean Razak (voiced by Jamie Hanes) – The leader of the Roughnecks, Razak is a seasoned veteran who has been decorated ten times for meritorious service. He is described as having "broken the mold" of trooper officer behavior. Razak's left arm is a mechanical prosthetic, the legacy of his first command where the entire squad was ambushed and only he survived. He later dies a heroic death to save Rico in the Homefront Campaign.
 Sergeant Francis Brutto (voiced by David DeLuise) – A somewhat ruthless taskmaster, Brutto is very outspoken and aggressive. Originally something of an antagonist for the rest of the squad, he eventually becomes easier to get along with during the Hydora Campaign. His son, Max, is 17 and an All-Star Fullback. Brutto is crippled before the Klendathu Campaign, and afterwards his son (who apparently joined the Mobile Infantry in the aftermath of the Pluto Campaign) is assigned to the Roughnecks. Like all the Roughnecks, Brutto originally was distrustful of T'Phai, but eventually became one of his best friends, prompting Higgins to remark, "Are those two actually bonding?" This bond extends to the point that when his son joins the Roughnecks he wants T'Phai to look out for his son.
 Corporal Richard "Doc" LeCroix (voiced by James Horan) – The team's medical officer, Doc is laid-back and patient. He and Goss act as the comic relief of the show at times, playing off each other's jokes amidst a folly of Bug drones. Doc is the assigned pilot for the "Duck" cargo Marauder exoskeleton.
 Corporal Jeff "Goss" Gossard (voiced by Bill Fagerbakke) – An ambitious Roughneck who wants a distinguished career. The elder of two siblings, Goss is a technological master, adept with any form of machinery. He invented the "TALC Box," which was intended to translate Bug shrieking into human language, but used to translate for Skinnies instead. Goss is the assigned pilot for the Long-Range aka "King Kong" Marauder. He had a short relationship with Dizzy following the Pluto Campaign, but broke up with her because he knows that Dizzy still loves Rico.
 Lieutenant/Ensign Carmen Ibanez (voiced by Tish Hicks) – A pilot in the SICON fleet. Rico joined the military just because Carmen said that she wanted to be a pilot and Rico blindly attempts to follow her. Carmen is smart, calm and rarely lets her emotions get in the way of her tasks. Whenever a drop ship she's piloting crash-lands, she helps the Roughnecks carry out their missions. While reminiscing about the past, Carmen admits that she had a big crush on Rico during the sixth grade, but didn't tell him. It is not clear if she feels the same way about Rico after Dizzy tells Carmen that she's the reason Rico enlisted. She is apparently demoted to Ensign either for crashing the ship or for insubordination in the first episode of the Klendathu Campaign.
 Lieutenant/Major Zander Barcalow (voiced by Nicholas Guest) – A former football player in high school, Barcalow joined the SICON fleet as a pilot and was ranked Major at the start of the Pluto Campaign. He started off as Carmen's flight instructor in a drop ship. Other than transporting troops, Barcalow occasionally flies fighters to provide air support. His personality is pompous and arrogant,  which may have led to his constant interchange between Major and Lieutenant ranks. During the Tesca Campaign, Barcalow started a relationship with Dizzy Flores, which lasted until the end of the Zephyr Campaign, when he was captured by the Bugs and became infected with an unknown virus, which gave him a Jekyll and Hyde complex. Things went worse during the Klendathu Campaign when Barcalow mutated into a Bug and nearly had the Valley Forge crash on Klendathu. He later died a noble death saving the Roughnecks after Dizzy reminded him "to play on her team."
 Special Operations Tactician Carl Jenkins (voiced by Rider Strong) – A psychic friend of Rico's and Dizzy's from high school, the other Roughnecks avoid Jenkins because his telepathic powers worry them. He destroys the Hydoran Brain Bug with a Mind-Bomb but suffers mental trauma in the process. Jenkins grows weaker and his powers become less stable during the Tophet Campaign, when T'Phai's Control Bug breaks loose and it attempts to attach to Jenkins. He destroys it with a telekinetic blast, but falls into a coma and is spirited away by Military intelligence. Jenkins returns later on in the series, the mental experimentation performed on him by Military intelligence neurosurgeons has increased his powers but made him cold and harsh. What was left of his old self is rekindled when Rico saved him during the Klendathu Campaign.
 Private Robert "Paperboy" Higgins (voiced by Alexander Polinsky) – A FedNet reporter assigned to the Roughnecks, Higgins is something of the trademark outsider. His inexperience and degree of military incompetence makes him something of a liability on occasion. Higgins usually shoots with a camera instead of a gun. He is able to stay in the squad only because Rico gave him training. Higgins is the narrator for the series.
 Private "Colonel" T'Phai (voiced by Steve Staley) – The former military leader of the Skinnies, T'Phai was an enemy for most of the Tophet Campaign under the influence of a Control Bug. He was indirectly responsible for Jenkins' extended medical leave, which didn't help when he was assigned to the Roughnecks during the Tesca Campaign. Not accepted initially, T'Phai receives the acceptance of all Roughnecks but Rico at the end of the first episode, not receiving Rico's approval until the end of the second episode. His rank is Private within the Mobile Infantry, but he is still referred to as Colonel (his Skinnie rank) by the Roughnecks. After enlisting with SICON, T'Phai studied human languages so he won't require a Talk Box. T'Phai is considered a father figure since he had a wife, who was also in the military, and two children. He believes in fighting a war so that his children would not have to share his fate.

SICON (SICO)
 Commander Marlow (voiced by Thomas Wagner) – Commanding officer of the Valley Forge, the starship to which Alpha Squad is initially assigned. Old-school fleet officer who was looking forward to retirement before the Bug War began.
 General Miriam Redwing (voiced by Irene Bedard) – Former flame of Lt. Jean Razak, and friend of Sgt. Charlie Zim; now a General at SICON Headquarters. A compassionate yet stern career officer.
 Sky Marshal Sanchez (voiced by R. Lee Ermey) – Top military brass of the SICON Forces. Has demonstrated a willingness to sacrifice civilian lives if he believes it will help achieve victory.  Note that the Sky Marshal in the novel was female, unusual for a 1950s SF novel.
 Lt. Earl Walker (voiced by Michael Harrington) – Intelligence officer who has an uneasy relationship with Razak and the Roughnecks. Seems to value intelligence data more than the human beings under his command who have to collect it. At one point, Walker was willing to ensure that Razak's military career would end during General Miriam Redwing's supposed disappearance being unaware of Redwing and Razak's sting operation against a mole within the SICON ranks.  During the Homefront campaign, Walker and Razak along with their squads put aside their differences and befriend each other.  Walker is not seen after Razak's death except for taking command of his squad fighting elsewhere during the conflict.
C.H.A.S. (Cybernetic Humanoid Assault System) (voiced by Ed Hopkins) – A prototype combat robot with state-of-the-art weaponry, armor and artificial intelligence. CHAS joined the Roughnecks for a single mission during the Tophet Campaign, at the end of which he sacrificed himself to save Higgins and the rest of the squad. Audio commentary by the production crew has stated that the C.H.A.S. units cost a lot of production resources. Although they do appear later as bridge guards and combat but are easily dispatched by the Zander bug.
Drill Instructor/Sergeant Charlie Zim – (voiced by Clancy Brown) Rico's and Flores' Drill instructor, who joins the Roughnecks during the final stages of the Homefront campaign. Revealed to Rico that machinations between him and Razak guided him to his potential as they recognized something great in him. Zim is the only character in the series that is voiced by the original film actor.

Bugs

Introduced in the Pluto campaign
 Warrior Bugs – The bulk of the Bug armies, they are about the size of large horses and scuttle around on four spindly legs. They attack with two spiked razor limbs and their razor-edged mandibles which can bite a person in half if they get close enough. Warrior Bugs are relatively weak against standard-issue weaponry, but they make up for this with large numbers. These Bugs have also proven to be able to climb up walls and dig underground.  They also do not need oxygen to survive as they have been seen on the outside of transport bugs while they were flying through space.
 Sentry Bugs – Bugs the size of dogs. they resemble fleas and can crawl up and down walls. The Sentry Bugs are early warning systems and play other support roles, usually found in or near nests. They have very little offensive capability but they have sharp teeth that can bite through steel cable and inflict nasty wounds.
 Tanker Bugs – These are like tanks. They are the size of houses and breathe fire as their main offensive weapon. Although they don't move quickly, their ability to tunnel underground allows them to pop up unexpectedly in the middle of a battle. Their armored exoskeleton makes them impervious to everything except high explosives such as mini-nukes and plasma rockets.
 Plasma Bugs – The Bug artillery, they are bigger than the Tanker Bugs, and have the rather nasty ability to fire huge, volatile globs of plasma from their rear ends at airborne or distant targets. One of the roughneck missions was to attempt to capture a baby one alive so researchers could find out how this plasma is generated.
 Hoppers – Acting as air support, they are about the size of Warrior Bugs and resemble mosquitoes with razor wings. They can bring down a light aircraft by grappling onto it, but their primary mode of attack is to simply ram their targets at high speed. Impervious to light weapons, they are vulnerable to explosive shells and "lizard lines." Hoppers are attracted to laser emissions like mosquitoes to a bug zapper.
 Transport Bugs - Creatures used for interstellar transport, they are fueled by water and can make planetary landings. The first one spotted was delivering eggs to Pluto, disproving the idea that the Bugs are native to the solar system.

Introduced in the Hydora campaign
 Kamikaze Ripplers – Flying Bugs that are similar to Hoppers except they can also shoot spikes from their mouths and can swim underwater. Later in the campaign the spikes exude a corrosive venom which burns flesh and destroys equipment.
"Momma" Rippler – A large Bug seen guarding a nest of Rippler eggs and thought to be their source.
 Water Tigers –  About the same size as warriors but much fatter, this pale species can swim quickly in water and is rarely seen on land. They have a venom that causes paralysis, and they use it to capture their prey alive to store in their larder.
 Brain Bugs –  Moving telepathic nodes, these are the generals of the bug army, coordinating all Bug activity through telepathic mind control.  They are large and almost too fat to move by themselves. Brain Bugs have slight offensive capabilities by using a psychic attack to stun humans. They have a slit-like mouth with a spike/sucker organ that extends from the mouth to pierce an enemy's skull and extract its brain to add the gained information to the hive mind collective.
 Chariot Bugs a.k.a. Minion Bugs – About the size of Sentry Bugs and bearing a resemblance to common roaches, these Bugs accompany and serve the Brain Bugs. When needed, the Brain Bugs can lie on top of them to be moved about.

Introduced in the Tophet campaign
 Blister Bugs – Slightly larger than a Warrior Bug. They carry a large supply of corrosive liquid which can be used to attack directly or dissolve walls and equipment.
 Blaster Bugs – Resembling Blisters, they absorb heat from the surrounding environment and focus it into a wave of heat energy capable of burning through power suits or melting rock.
 Control Bugs – Small Bugs, roughly the size of human hands. They seize control of a host by attaching themselves to the spinal cord, becoming a telepathic conduit for Brain Bugs. The range of their telepathic abilities has never been tested in the field. While having very little offensive capability on their own, they are very agile and difficult to hit with weapons. They are first encountered on Tophet, controlling the Skinnies.

Introduced in the Tesca campaign
 Jungle Spiders – Though looking more like crabs than actual spiders, Spider Bugs are eight-eyed and eight-legged with web-spinning capabilities. Smaller specimens are the size of Warrior Bugs and join them as shock troops. Larger ones capture enemies for "interrogation" by Brain Bugs or as DNA samples for Nurser Bugs.
 Nurser Bugs – Help care for Bug eggs until they hatch. They create new varieties of Bug by injecting DNA extracted from other species into Bug embryos. With no fighting capability, they are only seen in nests where eggs are being incubated.
 Tanker Worms – Used to dig small tunnels for Control Bugs. They have no offensive capabilities but their ability to dig silently allows the Control Bugs to launch surprise attacks.

Introduced in the Zephyr campaign
 Firefries – Small Bugs similar to fireflies, but actually on fire. Firefries grow to the size of warrior bugs, lose the ability to fly, and spit fire like a flamethrower.
Ice Bugs – Bugs the size of a large asteroid, found covered in ice and floating in space for eons. If one makes contact with Firefries they begin a symbiotic relationship where the Firefries feed on the Ice Bug while the Ice Bug uses the Firefries for energy.

Introduced in the Klendathu campaign
 Zander Bug – Major Barcalow after being transformed into a humanoid Bug. He has become bigger and Bug-like, but has kept his human intelligence.
 Nurser Spider – Similar to Nurser Bugs in that they can manipulate the DNA of Bug larvae, but resembling spiders. The Zander Bug uses them to create impostor bugs.
Impostor Bugs – Bugs designed to infiltrate SICON by disguising themselves in mobile infantry power suits.
Queen Bug – The master and leader of the entire Bug race. She is a huge Bug that can lay thousands of Bug eggs per day.
 Royal Guard Bug - A special type of warrior Bug that guards the Queen and her eggs.
 Super Transport Bugs - Nearly ten times the size of regular Transport Bugs, Super Transports are used to carry the Queen and a small army across star systems.  During the episode Trackers there are many Super Transports used as decoys.

Other alien creatures 
Skinnies - Roughly humanoid but very thin, this civilization is native to Tophet and enslaved by the bug army. Their weapons fire a stream of liquid that engulfs and then crushes the target. First encountered on Tophet.
Sparky - Squirrel like native of Tophet, it's friendly and has the ability to generate an electric field.
Seal Shark - Resembles a seal except for a jaw full of shark-like teeth. A voracious predator, it will attack humans and bugs alike. Native of Tesca Nemerosa.
Razorback Croc - Very similar to crocodiles except they are much larger and have a dorsal ridge. Native of Tesca Nemerosa.
Raptor Bird - Pterodactyl like creature the size of a human. Native of Tesca Nemerosa.
Space Leech - A parasitic creature that feeds on Ice Bugs and will aggressively attack both Firefries and humans. They produce a chemical which is toxic to the bug army. Seen during the Zephyr Campaign.

Technologies
In the show, there are various technologies used by SICON and the Skinnes:

Starships - Small city-like vessel that troopers consider their home-away-from home. They are equipped with hyperspace drives, subspace communicators, missiles, lasers and ballistics, including sensors that can detect movement of other crafts in other systems.
Dropship - A small type of ship that can drop and pickup troopers on planets. They are equipped with guns at the cockpit.
Marauder - A mecha-like exoskeleton that stands 10 ft. tall and walks faster than a human. Marauders are piloted by a single soldier and offer more firepower and augmented physical strength, at the cost of a limited power supply.  There are two kinds, the "Duck" and the "Ape."
Morita Smart Rifle - The standard issue weapon for all SICON troopers.  Capable of fully automatic or single-round fire.
Shock Stick - A staff weapon capable of delivering a powerful, usually non-lethal electric shock.  Many troopers carry shock sticks as a back-up weapon for their rifles.
Fighter - A small, short-ranged craft armed with missiles and machine guns used primarily for air-to-air combat to provide cover for ground troops.  Crewed by one or two people.  Capable of operating in space or planetary atmosphere.
Bomber - Similar to the fighter, but with explosive payloads instead of weapons. Used to destroy large groups of ground-based enemies or enemy strongholds.
Troop Transport - A six-wheeled transport used by troopers.
Flatbed - This is only shown on Pluto.  It is in the remains of an older station on Pluto from before Operation Pest Control.
Drop suit - A heavily armored suit that is capable of keeping the occupant alive while being dropped to a planet's surface from orbit.
Skimmer - A hovering transport, this is capable of going on both water and land and was even shown to have flight abilities.  Having no personal offensive capabilities, it relies on personnel to fire from the open deck of the ship.
Jet ski/Raft - A single-person transport used in water.
WASP flier - A one-manned flying unit that is capable of low level flight.  Razak attempts to strap two others to it, but it is unable to hold the weight.
Submersible - Similar to the troop transport, but for under water instead of over land.
Power Suit - Standard-issue armor for S.I.C.O.N. soldiers.  Has an air-tight seal, a self-contained air recycling system, radio, and flotation device.  M.I. troopers (as opposed to fleet pilots) also have jet-packs for short flights and a flip-down visor with zoom, thermal imaging, and assisted-targeting.
Grappling gun - Also known as Lizard Lines.  These guns fire drills with lines attached to them, and are capable of carrying great amounts of weight.  Two are capable of carrying a Marauder and two power suited soldiers.
Rocket Launcher - Packing more firepower than the rifles, the shoulder-mounted rocket launchers have a five-rocket magazine, each capable of destroying man-sized targets while injuring or destroying enemies close to the primary target.  Rockets can be substituted for small nuclear missiles capable of destroying plasma bugs and wounding other large enemies.

Deviations from the novel
 Whereas Johnny Rico is an Asian Filipino in Heinlein's original novel, Rico is portrayed as a Caucasian Argentinian living in Buenos Aires in Roughnecks. (In the first film and the Japanese OVA series, Rico is an Argentinian of Spanish descent).
 Private Jenkins, Rico's squad mate, and Carl, Rico's friend, are two different people in the novel, but are conflated in the film and series. Psychics ("Special Talents") are present in the novel, but their abilities are not specified; in the novel, Rico initially believes they merely have superhuman hearing when they detect bugs. In the series, Carl is alive and is a "talent" attached to the squad. In the novel, Carl dies during a bug raid at the beginning of the war.
 Dizzy Flores in the novel is a man. In the film and the animated series, the character was changed to a woman. In addition, Flores is wounded during the raid depicted in the novel's first chapter, and dies on the recovery ship shortly after the squad is evacuated.
 In the series, the Marauder is a large humanoid mech-type vehicle manned by one trooper as a fire support and gunnery platform. In the novel, the Marauder is the name of the standard armor worn by the majority of troopers.
 The Mobile Infantry in the novel did not accept women, whereas in the film and series they do.
 In the series and the film, Razak/Rasczak taught Dizzy and Rico. In the novel their instructor in "History and Moral Philosophy" is retired Lt. Col. Jean V. Dubois, whose letter to Rico encourages him past the emotional "hump" in training.
 The novel begins with a raid on the "Skinnies'" homeworld; the "Skinnies" aren't introduced in the series until the third campaign.
In the novel, Rasczak has already been killed and his Roughnecks honor his memory by being exceptional, while in the series Razak is alive until the Homefront Campaign.

References

External links
 Official Website  (via Internet Archive)
 TrooperPX.Comphotos, concept artwork.
 Roughnecks: STC Archivephotos, episode guide, fan fiction.
 Roughnecks Junkiesfan group for the series.
 "Roughnecks: The Starship Troopers Chronicles" debacleA summary on Ain't It Cool News of production schedule and distribution problems
 
 Fan page on Facebook

1990s American animated television series
2000s American animated television series
1999 American television series debuts
2000 American television series endings
Alien invasions in television
American children's animated action television series
American children's animated space adventure television series
American children's animated drama television series
American children's animated science fiction television series
American computer-animated television series
Starship Troopers television series
First-run syndicated television programs in the United States
Television series by Sony Pictures Television
English-language television shows
Fiction set on Pluto
Television series by Adelaide Productions